Christian Josef Danner (born 4 April 1958) is a former racing driver from Germany.

Career

Formula Two and Formula 3000
The son of car safety expert Max Danner, Danner started his motor racing career immediately after leaving school in 1977. After having raced in the Renault 5 cup Danner moved to the European Formula Two Championship for the  season. During his years in Formula Two Danner was a constant frontrunner. He scored several podiums but failed to win a race. Danner also set the F2 lap record of the current configuration of the old Nürburgring. Danner moved to the Formula 3000 championship in 1985 which replaced the Formula Two championship. With four wins Danner became the inaugural Formula 3000 championship winner.

Formula One

 saw Danner also made his Formula One debut with Zakspeed. He made two starts but failed to finish any races due to mechanical failures. For  he signed with minor Italian outfit Osella but struggled to make an impression with the car and its under powered Alfa Romeo engine. After failing to finish a race in the first six races, Danner moved to Arrows with their powerful BMW turbo engines and scored his first point at the Austrian Grand Prix.

The car was both un-competitive and often unreliable and when Danner finished a race it was always outside the points. The car was highly uncompetitive and a fourth place due to a high attrition rate at the 1989 United States Grand Prix was the only highlight of the year. Danner was fired after the Portuguese Grand Prix after only qualifying for four races that year.

Touring cars

After his Formula one career Danner became a regular competitor in the Deutsche Tourenwagen Meisterschaft. He made his debut in 1988 after failing to find a ride in Formula one. Danner made an impressive start to his touring car career as he won both races at the Hockenheimring driving a BMW M3. After only making sporadic appearances in 1989 and 1990, Danner made a full-time return to the series in 1991. He had a disappointing season and only had one points scoring finish. In 1993 Danner had his best season. He scored six podium finishes and finished fifth in the points standings. He also won a race at the Non-Championship round in Donington Park. Danner returned to winning ways in 1995 when he won a race at the Norisring. Danner kept racing touring cars through 1997.

In 1991 he also started in one British Touring Car Championship race at Thruxton driving a BMW M3.

Other racing
Danner competed in Japanese Formula 3000 in 1990 driving for Leyton House's F3000 team. He scored 4 points and was ranked 14th. In the nineties Danner made several appearances in the Indy Car World Series. His best finish was a seventh place at Homestead Miami in 1995. He also took part in the now defunct series, Grand Prix Masters.

Media career
After his racing career Danner became an F1 commentator for the channel RTL in his native Germany.

Motorsports career results

Career summary

Complete European Formula Two Championship results
(key) (Races in bold indicate pole position; races in italics indicate fastest lap)

Complete 24 Hours of Le Mans results

Complete International Formula 3000 results
(key) (Races in bold indicate pole position; races in italics indicate fastest lap.)

Complete Formula One World Championship results
(key) (Races in bold indicate pole position) (Races in italics indicate fastest lap)

Complete Deutsche Tourenwagen Meisterschaft results
(key) (Races in bold indicate pole position) (Races in italics indicate fastest lap)

Complete British Touring Car Championship results
(key) (Races in bold indicate pole position) (Races in italics indicate fastest lap)

Complete International Touring Car Championship results
(key) (Races in bold indicate pole position) (Races in italics indicate fastest lap)

Complete Super Tourenwagen Cup results
(key) (Races in bold indicate pole position) (Races in italics indicate fastest lap)

Complete Japanese Formula 3000 Championship results
(key) (Races in bold indicate pole position) (Races in italics indicate fastest lap)

American Open-Wheel racing results

PPG Indycar Series
(key) (Races in bold indicate pole position)

Complete Grand Prix Masters results
(key) Races in bold indicate pole position, races in italics indicate fastest lap.

References

External links

 Christian Danner – Official Website
Profile at grandprix.com

1958 births
Living people
Racing drivers from Bavaria
Sportspeople from Munich
German racing drivers
German Formula One drivers
Motorsport announcers
Zakspeed Formula One drivers
Osella Formula One drivers
Arrows Formula One drivers
Rial Formula One drivers
European Formula Two Championship drivers
International Formula 3000 Champions
International Formula 3000 drivers
Japanese Formula 3000 Championship drivers
Auto GP drivers
Champ Car drivers
Grand Prix Masters drivers
British Touring Car Championship drivers
Deutsche Tourenwagen Masters drivers
World Touring Car Championship drivers
24 Hours of Le Mans drivers
Speedcar Series drivers
World Sportscar Championship drivers
24 Hours of Spa drivers
Phoenix Racing drivers
Dale Coyne Racing drivers
EuroInternational drivers
Durango drivers
BMW M drivers
RSM Marko drivers
Schnitzer Motorsport drivers
Nürburgring 24 Hours drivers
Sauber Motorsport drivers
GT4 European Series drivers